Wingate Football Club was an English football club based in Hendon, Greater London. Established in 1946, the club merged with Finchley in 1991 to form Wingate & Finchley.

History
The club was formed in 1946 by Maurice Rebak, Harvey Sadow, Frank Davis, George Hyams and Asher Rebak, who aimed to create a Jewish club with the aim of fighting anti-semitism. It was named after Orde Wingate, who had been involved in training the Haganah, the precursor to the Israeli Defense Forces.

They started playing in the Middlesex Senior League, and were founder members of the Parthenon League in 1951, winning the league in its first season. In 1952 they joined the Premier Division of the London League, where they remained for ten years until joining the Delphian League in 1962. Their first season in the league saw the league programme abandoned due to the weather and an emergency competition arranged, in which they finished seventh out of eight clubs. At the end of the season the league merged with and became Division Two of the Athenian League. During their time in the Athenian league the club represented Great Britain in the Maccabiah Games.

In 1972, the club's Hall Lane ground was demolished to make way for an extension of the M1 motorway, and they moved to Finchley's Summers Lane ground. In 1975, they merged with Leyton to form Leyton-Wingate.

In 1984, the club was re-established and joined Division One of the Herts County League. They won the division at the first attempt, and were promoted to the Premier Division. In 1989 they joined Division One of the South Midlands League, and after finishing second in their first season, were promoted to the Premier Division. 

After one season in the Premier Division they merged with Finchley to form Wingate & Finchley. The new club took Wingate's place in the South Midlands League, but played at Finchley's ground, which was renamed the Harry Abrahams Stadium in honour of a long-term Wingate supporter.

Honours
Parthenon League
Champions 1951–52
Herts County League
Division One champions 1984–85

References

Association football clubs established in 1946
Jewish football clubs
Jews and Judaism in the United Kingdom
Defunct football clubs in London
Defunct football clubs in England
London League (football)
Parthenon League
Delphian League
Athenian League
South Midlands League
Association football clubs disestablished in 1991
1946 establishments in England
1991 disestablishments in England
Diaspora association football clubs in England